Cyberworthiness is an assessment of the resilience of a system from cyber attacks. It can be applied to a range of software and hardware elements (such as standalone software, code deployed on an internet site, the browser itself, military mission systems, commercial equipment, or IoT devices).

See also
 Airworthiness
 Crashworthiness
 Roadworthiness
 Railworthiness
 Seaworthiness
 Spaceworthiness

References

Information science
Computing terminology